The following events occurred in June 1937:

June 1, 1937 (Tuesday)
In Italy, the Ministry of Popular Culture ordered all foreign words and names to be Italianized. Louis Armstrong, for example, was to be known as Luigi Fortebraccio.
Oldsmobile announced the first automatic transmission available to the public.
Bill Dietrich of the Chicago White Sox pitched an 8-0 no-hitter against the St. Louis Browns.
Born: Morgan Freeman, actor, director and narrator, in Memphis, Tennessee; Rosaleen Linehan, actress, in Dublin, Ireland

June 2, 1937 (Wednesday)
Rioting broke out around İskenderun and Antioch after the Syrian parliament refused to ratify the League of Nations' decision to make the İskenderun district autonomous.
German War Minister Werner von Blomberg began a three-day visit to Italy to discuss German-Italian military ties.
St. Louis Cardinals pitcher Dizzy Dean was suspended by National League President Ford Frick for referring to Frick and umpire George Barr "the two biggest crooks in baseball today."
Born: Jimmy Jones, singer-songwriter, in Birmingham, Alabama (d. 2012); Sally Kellerman, actress and singer, in Long Beach, California; Don Turnbull, journalist, editor and game designer, in Preston, Lancashire, England (d. 2003)
Died: Louis Vierne, 66, French organist and composer

June 3, 1937 (Thursday)
The Duke of Windsor and Wallis Warfield (Simpson) were married at the Château de Candé in Monts, France.
Dizzy Dean refused to sign a letter of apology and threatened to sue Ford Frick for $250,000.
Born: Phyllis Baker, baseball player, in Marshall, Michigan (d. 2006); Crawford Hallock Greenewalt, Jr., classical archaeologist, in Wilmington, Delaware (d. 2012); Solomon P. Ortiz, politician, in Robstown, Texas
Died: Emilio Mola, 49, Spanish Nationalist commander (plane crash)

June 4, 1937 (Friday)
Fumimaro Konoe became Prime Minister of Japan.
The Kriegsmarine held its first maneuvers off Heligoland since the island was refortified in defiance of the Treaty of Versailles. Only a skeleton fleet participated because so many ships were deployed in Spain.
The National League lifted its suspension of Dizzy Dean, who stuck with his vow not to sign a letter of apology but issued a letter of "explanation" instead. Dean lost $500 during the course of his suspension.
Sylvan Goldman introduced an invention of his called a shopping cart at the Humpty Dumpty supermarket he owned in Oklahoma City.
Born: Gorilla Monsoon, professional wrestler and commentator, in Rochester, New York (d. 1999)
Died: Helmut Hirsch, 21, German Jew convicted of conspiring in a bombing plot against the government (executed by decapitation)

June 5, 1937 (Saturday)
French troops were rushed to the İskenderun region to control the rioting between Arabs and Turks.

June 6, 1937 (Sunday)
The Segovia Offensive ended in Republican failure.

June 7, 1937 (Monday)
Benito Mussolini and Galeazzo Ciano became the first recipients of the Order of the German Eagle.
Born: Roberto Blanco, singer and actor, in Tunis, Tunisia; Neeme Järvi, conductor, in Tallinn, Estonia
Died: Jean Harlow, 26, American actress (kidney disease)

June 8, 1937 (Tuesday)
In London, representatives of Argentina, Australia, Great Britain, Ireland, Norway, South Africa, Germany and the United States reached an agreement to stop the dangerous reduction of the world's whale stocks through whaling.
The German Postal Ministry decreed that all non-Aryans must retire.
The Carl Orff composition Carmina Burana premiered in Frankfurt.
The French war film La Grande Illusion (The Grand Illusion) directed by Jean Renoir was released.
A total solar eclipse occurred.
Born: Toni Harper, child singer, in Los Angeles

June 9, 1937 (Wednesday)
The funeral of Jean Harlow was held at a chapel in the Forest Lawn Memorial Park in Glendale, California. William Powell, Lionel Barrymore, Clark Gable, Spencer Tracy and Norma Shearer were among the mourners in attendance.
The Citizens' War Memorial was unveiled in Christchurch, New Zealand.
Born: Harald Rosenthal, hydriobiologist, in Berlin, Germany

June 10, 1937 (Thursday)
Nazi Germany announced an ambitious 15-year development plan for the city of Hamburg that would see the construction of a 60-story skyscraper and a suspension bridge across the Elbe.
The Boston Red Sox traded the future Baseball Hall of Famer Rick Ferrell, his brother Wes and Mel Almada to the Washington Senators in exchange for Ben Chapman and Bobo Newsom.
Born: Luciana Paluzzi, actress, in Rome, Italy
Died: Jane Foss Barff, 73, Australian women's rights advocate; Robert Borden, 82, 8th Prime Minister of Canada

June 11, 1937 (Friday)
The secret Moscow trial known as the Case of Trotskyist Anti-Soviet Military Organization began.
The comedy film A Day at the Races starring the Marx Brothers was released.
Born:
 Don Fleming, American college and professional football player; in Bellaire, Ohio (d. 1963)
 Robin Warren, pathologist and Nobel laureate; in Adelaide, Australia
Died: Máté Zalka, 41, Hungarian writer and revolutionary (killed in the Spanish Civil War)

June 12, 1937 (Saturday)
The Case of Trotskyist Anti-Soviet Military Organization ended swiftly with eight Soviet generals sentenced to be shot for treason.
The Battle of Bilbao started as the Nationalists launched an assault on the city.
The Republicans launched the Huesca Offensive.
Ralph Guldahl won the U.S. Open.
The Greater Texas & Pan-American Exposition opened in Dallas, Texas.
Born: Mujaddid Ahmed Ijaz, experimental physicist, in Lahore, British India (d. 1992)
Died: Boris Feldman, 46 or 47, Soviet military commander; Vitaly Primakov, 39, Soviet military commander; Vitovt Putna, 44, Soviet military officer; Mikhail Tukhachevsky, 44, Soviet military leader; Ieronim Uborevich, 41, Soviet military commander; Iona Yakir, 40, Soviet military commander

June 13, 1937 (Sunday)
The Nationalists came within two miles of Bilbao, capturing a range of hills east of the city.

June 14, 1937 (Monday)
Nationalists captured Las Arenas, cutting Bilbao off from the sea.
The Irish Parliament was dissolved and new elections called for July 1.
The Social Credit backbenchers' revolt in Alberta came to an end when Premier William Aberhart finally got a budget passed in the legislature by a vote of 40–7.

June 15, 1937 (Tuesday)
Switzerland recognized the Italian conquest of Ethiopia.
Born: Herbert Feuerstein, comedian and entertainer, in Zell am See, Austria (d. 2020); Waylon Jennings, musician and actor, in Littlefield, Texas (d. 2002); Alan Thornett, Trotskyist activist, in Britain

June 16, 1937 (Wednesday)
Spanish Prime Minister Juan Negrín banned POUM. Andrés Nin and other leaders were arrested; Nin soon disappeared mysteriously and was presumed murdered by Soviet agents.
Germany and Italy rejoined neutral ship patrols around Spain.
Born: Simeon Saxe-Coburg-Gotha, monarch and politician, in Sofia, Bulgaria; Charmian May, actress, in Purbrook, England (d. 2002)
Died: Alexander Chervyakov, 45, Belarusian Communist leader (suicide)

June 17, 1937 (Thursday)
A state funeral was held in Germany for 31 victims of the May 29 Deutschland incident.
The adventure film King Solomon's Mines premiered in the United Kingdom.
The drama film The Road Back starring John King and Richard Cromwell premiered at the Globe Theatre in New York City.
Cuban band Orquesta Casino de la Playa record "Bruca maniguá", Arsenio Rodríguez's first hit.

June 18, 1937 (Friday)
Nationalists captured the Santo Domingo hills northeast of Bilbao after a week-long assault and surrounded the city completely.
Secretary of the National Fascist Party Achille Starace made it mandatory for all members of the party to subscribe to Mussolini's newspaper, Il Popolo d'Italia.
Born: Wray Carlton, AFL and CFL running back, in Wallace, North Carolina; Vitaly Zholobov, cosmonaut, in Zburjevka, Ukrainian SSR
Died: Gaston Doumergue, 73, French politician

June 19, 1937 (Saturday)
The Battle of Bilbao ended with the Nationalist capture of the city.
The Huesca Offensive ended in Republican failure.
The Women's day massacre occurred in  Youngstown, Ohio.
Pennsylvania Governor George Howard Earle III declared martial law in Johnstown.
Died: J. M. Barrie, 77, Scottish author and dramatist

June 20, 1937 (Sunday)
A Soviet Tupolev ANT-25 aircraft flew over the North Pole and landed in Vancouver, Washington. The flight was made to test the prospects of trans-polar air travel.
All Catholic schools in Bavaria were closed by the Nazis. 
The Geibeltbad Pirna was founded near Dresden, Germany.
Born: Rosa Luna, Uruguayan dancer (d. 1993)

June 21, 1937 (Monday)
Léon Blum resigned as Prime Minister of France when the Senate refused to give him special powers to deal with the country's financial crisis.
Ohio Governor Martin L. Davey ordered 4,500 National Guardsmen to Youngstown.
The Wimbledon Championships were televised for the first time, on BBC Television.

June 22, 1937 (Tuesday)
Camille Chautemps became Prime Minister of France for the third time.
Joe Louis won boxing's World Heavyweight Championship with an eighth-round knockout of James J. Braddock at Comiskey Park in Chicago.
An espionage tribunal was established in the Spanish Republic with the primary task of putting members of POUM on trial.

June 23, 1937 (Wednesday)
Hitler sent the strongest units of the Kriegsmarine toward Valencia for a "demonstration" after dropping out of the international neutral ship patrol for the second time, since Britain and France refused to allow Germany to secure satisfaction for an alleged Spanish submarine attack on the cruiser . Spain warned that it would fight back if any power shelled a Republican city.
Born: Martti Ahtisaari, 10th President of Finland and Nobel laureate, in Viipuri, Finland

June 24, 1937 (Thursday)
Paul Robeson made an important speech on the Spanish Civil War at the Royal Albert Hall in London during a benefit to raise funds for Basque refugee children. "There is no standing above the conflict on Olympian heights. There are no impartial observers", Robeson said. "The liberation of Spain from the oppression of fascist reactionaries is not a private matter of the Spaniards, but the common cause of all advanced and progressive humanity."
The 8th Imperial Conference ended.
Liechtenstein added a crown to its national flag so it would no longer be identical to the flag of Haiti.

June 25, 1937 (Friday)
Neville Chamberlain made his first major foreign policy speech in the House of Commons, in which he asked influential members of British society to exercise caution when talking about Germany's policy toward Spain to avoid a larger European war. "I have read that in the high mountains there are sometimes conditions to be found when an incautious move or even a sudden loud exclamation may start an avalanche", Chamberlain said. "That is just the condition in which we are finding ourselves to-day. I believe, although the snow may be perilously poised it has not yet begun to move, and if we can all exercise caution, patience and self-restraint we may yet be able to save the peace of Europe."
The historical adventure film Wee Willie Winkie starring Shirley Temple and Victor McLaglen premiered in Los Angeles.
Born: Keizō Obuchi, Prime Minister of Japan, in Nakanojō, Gunma, Japan (d. 2000) 
Died: Colin Clive, 37, English actor (tuberculosis)

June 26, 1937 (Saturday)
Mary Pickford and Charles "Buddy" Rogers were married in a simple ceremony in Los Angeles.
Born: Robert Coleman Richardson, experimental physicist, in Washington, D.C. (d. 2013)

June 27, 1937 (Sunday)
Martin Niemöller gave what would be his last sermon in Nazi Germany, stating, "No more are we ready to keep silent at man's behest when God commands us to speak. For it is, and must remain, the case that we must obey God rather than man."

June 28, 1937 (Monday)
The new French Finance Minister Georges Bonnet addressed the country's financial crisis by closing the stock market and suspending all commercial payments in gold and foreign currencies until further notice.
The Soviet Union executed 36 more people for spying.
Born: Ron Luciano, baseball umpire, in Endicott, New York (d. 1995)
Died: George Warren Russell, 83, New Zealand politician

June 29, 1937 (Tuesday)
The Nationalists occupied Balmaseda.
Canadian Prime Minister William Lyon Mackenzie King had separate meetings with Hermann Göring and Adolf Hitler in Berlin. Mackenzie King's diary entry that day described Hitler as "a man of deep sincerity and a genuine patriot."
The Lewiston–Auburn shoe strike ended in defeat of the workers.

June 30, 1937 (Wednesday)
Franklin Delano Roosevelt, Jr. and Ethel du Pont were married in Wilmington, Delaware in the American society wedding of the decade.
German Reichsminister of Church Affairs Hanns Kerrl decreed state control of Protestant church funds. The government now controlled all aspects of the churches' financial activities, right down to ministers' salaries.
Portugal stopped co-operating with the Non-Intervention Committee patrol agreement and ordered British observers off its soil.
The emergency number 999 was introduced in the United Kingdom, the first emergency telephone number of its kind in the world.
Born: Noel Black, film and television director, screenwriter and producer, in Chicago (d. 2014)
Died: Frank A. Vanderlip, 72, American banker

References

1937
1937-06
1937-06